Aleksandr Nikolaevich Berkutov (21 May 1933 – 7 November 2012) was a Russian rower who had his best achievements in double sculls, paired with Yuriy Tyukalov. Together they won five consecutive European titles in 1956–61, the Henley Royal Regatta in 1957 and 1958, the Soviet title in 1957 and 1961, an Olympic gold medal in 1956, and an Olympic silver in 1960.

Berkutov started as a single sculler, and in 1954 won the Soviet title and a bronze medal at the European Championships. Next year, facing strong competition from the rising star Vyacheslav Ivanov, he changed to doubles. He retired in 1961 to become a rowing coach, and in 1972 replaced Tyukalov as the head coach of the Soviet national team. From 1990 until his death, he lectured at the Russian State University of Physical Education, Sport, Youth and Tourism.

References

External links
 
 Aleksandr Berkutov's obituary  (English translation via Google)

1933 births
2012 deaths
Sportspeople from Samara, Russia
Russian male rowers
Rowers at the 1956 Summer Olympics
Rowers at the 1960 Summer Olympics
Olympic rowers of the Soviet Union
Medalists at the 1956 Summer Olympics
Medalists at the 1960 Summer Olympics
Olympic gold medalists for the Soviet Union
Olympic silver medalists for the Soviet Union
Olympic medalists in rowing
Burials in Troyekurovskoye Cemetery
European Rowing Championships medalists